Walson Augustin (born 20 July 1988) is a Haitian footballer who plays for Brothers Union  in the Bangladesh Premier league as a midfielder.

Career
Augustin played club football for Don Bosco FC and Valencia FC in the Ligue Haïtienne before moving abroad. He led Valencia in scoring with eight league goals as the club won the 2012 championship, its first title.

Augustin has appeared for the Haiti national football team, scoring a goal against French Guiana in a friendly during preparation for 2012 Caribbean Cup qualification. He also played for Haiti at youth level, scoring twice in a victory that eliminated Guatemala from 2007 FIFA U-20 World Cup qualifying.

References 

1988 births
Living people
Haitian footballers
Haiti international footballers
Haitian expatriate footballers
Haitian expatriate sportspeople in Bangladesh
Expatriate footballers in Bangladesh
Haitian expatriate sportspeople in the Dominican Republic
Expatriate footballers in the Dominican Republic
Association football midfielders
Liga Dominicana de Fútbol players